Ming Dynasty is a 2019 Chinese historical television series starring Tang Wei and Zhu Yawen, which aired on Hunan Television until 2020. It is adapted from the novel The Chronicle of the Six Eras by Lianjing Zhuyi, which is a fictionalised account of the life of Empress Sun, who was an empress consort of the Xuande Emperor. The show gained much attention and viewership from non-Chinese viewers, having already achieved high ratings in mainland China, despite the director taking on an artistic interpretation of the source material.

Synopsis 
The TV series started with the violent transition of power from the Jianwen Emperor to the Yongle Emperor during the Ming dynasty. The Jianwen Emperor was chosen to be emperor by his grandfather, the founder of the Ming dynasty, the Hongwu Emperor. The Yongle Emperor, the uncle of Emperor Jianwen, had never accepted his father's choice, and so he plotted with his sons to overthrow his nephew.

During the insurrection, the Yongle Emperor ordered many high-ranking officials of the court loyal to the Jianwen Emperor to be executed. Among them was the royal doctor Jing Qing, whose entire family was also condemned alongside him. Nevertheless, his two daughters managed to escape execution, but were separated in the process. The youngest daughter is adopted by a high ranking inner court attendant named Hu and was given the name Hu Shanxiang. The eldest daughter was rescued and adopted by the general Sun Yu and given the name Sun Ruowei. The two daughters were raised under different people, living out very different lives: the youngest daughter was raised in the Imperial Palace as a maid and the older daughter was raised with a group of rebels loyal to the previous emperor. One key advantage of how Sun Ruowei was raised was her literacy and her martial arts skills; these essential skills proved to be helpful later in her life.

Years later, Qingzheng Cult, which Sun Ruowei was raised with, continually plotted to overthrow Emperor Yongle and re-establish the previous Emperor Jianwen. During this time, the Emperor Yongle's favorite grandson Zhu Zhangji was a zealot in purging the remaining revolutionaries; he came into contact with Sun Ruowei in these purging pursuits. In the course of time, Zhu Zhangji's heart was captured by Sun Ruowei, even though she did nothing to seduce him. He was simply attracted to her character and how she behaved so differently from all the palace ladies; like how she spoke her mind.

In due time, Zhu Zhangji lied to his grandfather by covering up Sun Ruowei's background and was en route to marry her. Upon their marriage, Sun Ruowei became Imperial Concubine to the Imperial Grandson. During this time, the younger sister of Sun Ruowei, Hu Shanxiang, rose among the ranks to a fairly high ranking attendant. But, it was not enough for her and she sought out to advance further at all costs. She colluded with Zhu Zhangji's second uncle (Prince Han) and asked him to recommend her to be a concubine for Zhu Zhangji. In exchange, Hu will be his agent embedded in Zhu Zhangji's palace. This collusion came through successfully and both sisters were married to Zhu Zhangji.

At this time, there were still quite a bit of warring tribes in the northern frontiers (outside the Great Wall) where the people groups such as the Tartars, Oirats, and the like were harassing China and diplomacy was unsuccessful. Emperor Yongle was getting sick and tired of them and wanted to make a final push to force them to surrender and leave China alone. During the one plus year of war, Crown Prince Zhu Gaochi was left in Beijing to run the country while Emperor Yongle, his sons and grandson were out at war. But, Zhu Gaochi was already ill and he needed help with reading and writing all the war correspondence with his father in the battlefield. He found out that his new daughter-in-law (Sun Ruowei) was literate and that her calligraphy was very similar to his, so he recruited her to be his personal scribe for the war effort. This provided a great opportunity for Sun Ruowei to know the ropes of running the country at war. As the Crown Prince Zhu Gaichi's health deteriorated, she had to deliberate and give orders to the imperial counsels. It gave her the opportunity to establish herself, not as a typical helpless imperial concubine but as a woman who was gifted, literate and had a pure selfless love for the country.

Unfortunately, Emperor Yongle died in the field during this final war expedition due to previous illnesses. This forced the entire nation into another power transition; suspicions were heightened and everyone was actively on guard. During this period, Zhu Zhangji, with the collaboration of imperial loyalists, hid the dead body of his grandfather from his two uncles who were stationed with troops at different locations in the same war expedition. He also modified his grandfather's imperial edict posthumously to make his father the emperor instead of his second uncle. Although Emperor Yongle loved his grandson a lot and wanted him to be the emperor, he knew how unbounded his second son's heart was for the throne. He knew that the second son would kill his grandson if he made his grandson Emperor. Zhu Zhanji was never going to submit to his evil uncles because he knew, based on what his uncles had done, that China would become an evil empire if his second uncle was made the emperor. As such, no announcements were made to anyone about Emperor Yongle's passing and his body was secretly moved back to Beijing. Zhu Zhangji returned to Beijing briefly to convince the court that his father Zhu Gaochi was the rightful next emperor before he returned to the fields. It was only after Zhu Gaochi ascended to the throne before the news of the death of Emperor Yongle was released to the two uncles of Zhu Zhangji. This caused a huge uproar from the two uncles, who were continually plotting for the throne even during the time when Emperor Yongle was alive. In the end, this final war expedition of Emperor Yongle with the northern tribes ended in failure and the troops retreated back behind the Great Wall and returned to Beijing.

In the meantime, the Crown Prince Zhu Gaochi ascended the throne as the Hongxi Emperor and had to deal with his two brothers and his own son, who were plotting to kill each other. Even before he ascended to the throne, he was supposedly suffering from diabetes and his organs were failing. With the sudden shove to be Emperor and the stress of handling state affairs together with protecting his son against his brothers, it had a large toll on his health. The reign of the Hongxi Emperor was, indeed, brief: it only lasted for a year or so.

Zhu Zhangji wasted no time and put himself as Xuande Emperor while his uncles continued to collude and spread rumors about him in the court, although he made sure they were pretty well shadowed and restricted. This, he did, because he promised his father and grandfather not to kill the uncles after he became the emperor. Unlike his father, his style of ruling was similar to his grandfather Emperor Yongle: authoritative and will not think twice about killing rebels and colluders. As we know, his grandfather's final war expedition failed and the northern tribes were once again harassing China. The Xuande Emperor felt like he needed to fulfill what his grandfather failed and made a final push to personally lead the army to force a surrender on the northern tribes. He succeeded in killing the leader (Mahamud) of the northern tribes and they succumbed to the will of the Ming. They made concessions and this ended the northern threats for, at least, a decade or so. In the course of the battle, the Xuande Emperor was badly injured and one of his lungs was punctured. He recovered enough to return to Beijing.

Over time, Sun Ruowei's hatred for Emperor Yongle and her quest for revenge dissipated as she weighed the costs of many other human lives to achieve her revenge. The character development for Sun Ruowei rises from a vengeful rebel to a woman with stately and noble heart for her subjects; above all, her love for the country as a whole. Eventually, she submitted to Zhu Zhangji's love and promised to love him even after death. After the untimely passing of the Xuande Emperor, Sun Ruowei successively experienced the power usurpation of her son Emperor Yingzong of Ming by the Jingtai Emperor.

With her wisdom and ability, she rescued the Ming dynasty several times from danger while helping her son to become a noble and virtuous ruler. (This can be further expanded)

In the end, Sun Ruowei realized that she could not redeem the Zhu family morally; especially, those who had the intention to be emperor. She further realized that because all those who did, wanted bloodshed and were willing to kill their own siblings, uncles, loyal scholars and whoever who spoke against their will.  This realization gives her freedom to accept her fate and let Empress Dowager Sun die.  However, Xu Bin convinces her to let Ruowei live on by promising to take her to the sea, re-igniting her long-held dream of personal freedom.  After convincing the emperor to release himself and his mother to follow their own paths, the two set out on a treasure ship to explore the world together.

Cast

Main 

 Tang Wei as Sun Ruowei, Empress Sun
 The daughter of an Imperial Physician killed during the reign of Yongle Emperor later adopted by Sun Zhong and renamed as Sun Ruowei. She is intelligent and brave; however, she is manipulated by the Qingzheng cult to seek revenge for her parents' death. She longs to be reunited with her younger sister, who was separated from her while they were running away. She encounters Zhu Zhanji, who suspects her motives and identity. Through their encounters, Zhanji falls in love with her despite knowing her background and her love for Xu Bin. After her father passes away, she honors her father's arrangements for her to married to Zhanji and moves into Forbidden City to become Zhanji's concubine. After getting married, she helps the ill Crown Prince Hongxi Emperor in the affairs of the state, which familiarizes her with state and military affairs and gets her into trouble with the Yongle Emperor as it is taboo for women of the harem to intervene in government affairs. When Zhu Zhanji ascends the throne, she is titled Huang Fei and it is clear from Zhanji's treatment that he loves her more and prefers her over her long-lost sister Hu Shanxiang, who happens to be Zhanji's legitimate wife and Empress. When Ruowei becomes pregnant soon after Shanxiang's miscarriage, tension grows. However Ruowei continues to protect Shanxiang from Zhanji's suspicion and mistrust. Ruowei then gives birth to Zhu Qizhen When Zhanji finds out the truth behind Shanxiang's relationship with Prince Han, he deposes her and promotes Ruowei as his Empress. Soon Ruowei is made aware that Yongle Emperor decreed that if she bore a son, she should not be allowed to live to protect the Ming dynasty from a usurper. However, Zhanji decides to let Ruowei live and instead of having her buried alive with him and entrusts the country to her before dying. When asked if she ever regretted this life, she tells Zhanji that she doesn't and tells him that she is grateful to him for giving her the love of her life. After his death, Ruowei is tasked with the regnancy of the kingdom, raising her child with development issues and dealing with her sister and her son and the Empress Zhang. Ruowei protects the kingdom multiple times during the ascension and deposing of her son and the Jingtai Emperor, but grows sick and tired of all of the deaths and political machinations she witnessed. She severs ties with her son telling him that every surviving member of the Zhu family is a living dead person. At the end of the series, she leaves the kingdom to travel the world with Xu Bin in the afterlife, fulfilling her wish from when she was a young woman.
 Zhu Yawen as Zhu Zhanji, Xuande Emperor, Hongxi Emperor's 1st son (Crown prince)
 The son of Hongxi Emperor and Empress Zhang. He is ambitious, proud and aims to be like his grandfather. A favorite of the Yongle Emperor, he encounters Ruowei while investigating an attempt to assassinate the Emperor. He falls in love with Ruowei and promises her dying father to take care of her. However, he is forced to marry Hu Shanxiang, a candidate nominated by Prince Han and takes Ruowei as his concubine. While fighting a battle with the Emperor, he finds out the Emperor's plan to enthrone Prince Han instead of his father, he blocks all news of the death of the Emperor which causes the deepening of resentment between him and Prince Han and Prince Zhao. After his father's death, he is enthroned as the Xuande Emperor. Prince Han begins to lose his mind and Prince Zhao attempts to manipulate him against Prince Han. After the birth of his children, he finds out that the Empress allowed Prince Han to escape Beijing resulting in a huge rebellion that almost took his life. He also finds out that Prince Han's conspiracies led to his father's and grandfather's death. After the revelation, Zhanji distances himself from all politics and grows immensely sick. He also reveals to Ruowei about the edict left behind to have her killed if she bore a son, and tells her he is contemplating having her buried with him alive. However, he takes her off the list containing the people who would be buried alive with him and tells her that despite his love for her, he has to let her go for the sake of their son.
Deng Jiajia as Hu Shanxiang, Empress Gongrangzhang
Sun Rouwei's long lost sister. After their separation, she is adopted by Hu Shangyi and becomes a female officer in the palace. She becomes Zhu Zhanji's legitimate wife with the help of Prince Han. She is ambitious and obsessed with power.

Supporting

Royal family

 Tan Xueliang as Zhu Yunwen, Jianwen Emperor
 Wang Xueqi as Zhu Di, Yongle Emperor
 Liang Guanhua as Zhu Gaochi, Hongxi Emperor, Yongle Emperor's 1st son (Crown Prince)
 Yu Haoming as Zhu Gaoxu, Prince of Han
Yongle Emperor's second son. He is a highly ambitious individual.
 Luan Yuanhui as Zhu Gaosui, Prince of Zhao, Yongle Emperor's 3rd son
 Wu Yue as Zhang Yan, Empress Zhang
Wife of the Hongxi Emperor.
 Long Ni as Consort Wei
Prince Han's consort.
 Lay Zhang as Zhu Qizhen, Yingzong Emperor
He is Xuande Emperor's eldest son by Sun Rouwei. He becomes the Emperor of Ming at a young age with no governing experience.  He is loved by his people through his determination to govern.
 Li Xinliang as Zhu Qiyu, Jingtai Emperor, Xuande Emperor's second son
 Hu Lingmeng as Empress Qian
 Chu Junchen as Sima Guang
 Zhao Yingzi as Noble Consort An
Zhu Di's concubine. She is the daughter of King Taejong of Joseon and Consort Piao's older sister. Although she holds a high position in the palace (Noble Consort [Guifei,貴妃], she is not favoured and had no children.
 Sun Xiaoxiao as Consort Piao
Zhu Di's concubine. With the help of her older sister Noble Consort An, she is able to meet the Emperor.

Ministers

 Qiao Zhenyu as Xu Bin
The son of a deceased minister and an orphan at Jingnan. He has always loved Sun Ruowei and does everything he can to protect her.
 Gao Kaiyuan as Xie Jin
 Zhang Hao as Yang Shiqi
 Jiang Yang as Yang Rong
 Yang Weiqi as Yang Pu
 Zhou Yunshen as Jing Qing
 Su Ke as Yu Qian
 Guo Zhiting as Fan Zhong
 Tang Jianjun as Xu Youzhen
 Fu Lei as Shi Heng
 Dai Chaodong as Cao Bin
 Jianuo Guo as Chen Wenrong

Others

 Sun Yaoqi as Shuang Xi
 A female officer.
 Shi Yueling as Hu Shangyi
Hu Shanxiang's adoptive mother. She holds the position of the highest-ranking female official in the palace, is a very cruel and ruthless character, but very skilled, and is well versed in the way of the harem.
Choenyi Tsering as Qi Muge
Princess of Wala. She fell in love with Zhu Qizhen and gave birth to his son Zhu Jianshen. She is killed by Zhu Qiyu.
 Wei Wei as Huangpu Yunhe
 Cao Minghua as Mahamud
 Zhu Jiayi as Jing Qing's wife
 Lobsang Namdak as Nie Xing
 Cui Tianyi as Xiao Douzi
 Li Haohan as Yao Guangxiao, Buddhist Monk, adviser of Yongle Emperor and mentor of Xuande Emperor

Production 
Director Zhang Ting was previously the screenwriter for numerous well known dramas including Four Generations Under One Roof while supervisor Zhang Li has previously produced many famous historical drama including Towards the Republic, Ming Dynasty in 1566 and The Road We Have Taken. The crew also includes creative director Zhao Hai, winner of both the Hong Kong Film Award and Golden Rooster Awards and Academy Awards nominee costume designer, William Chang. William Chang designed 140 costumes for Tang Wei's character in the series.

Casting 
To immerse in the role, Tang Wei prepared 8 months beforehand to learn about the history and culture of the Ming dynasty. Approximately 400 extras auditioned for the drama while the line-up for the main cast exceeded ten actors.

Filming 
Principal photography started at Wuxi on 18 December 2017 and wrapped up on 29 July 2018.

Original soundtrack 

The main composer of the Ming Dynasty OST is Dong Yingda, who also worked on The Great River (2018) and Like a Flowing River (2019). All versions of "One Heart" and "Life Guardian" were not included in the album and were released independently.

Ratings 

 Highest ratings are marked in red, lowest ratings are marked in blue

Award and nominations

External links
 Ming Dynasty on IMDb

References 

Chinese historical television series
2019 Chinese television series debuts
2020 Chinese television series endings
Hunan Television dramas
Television shows based on Chinese novels
Television series set in the Ming dynasty